Cyrus II of Persia, commonly known as Cyrus the Great, was the founder of the Achaemenid Empire, the first Persian empire. Under his rule, the empire embraced all of the previous civilized states of the ancient Near East, expanded vastly and eventually conquered most of Western Asia and much of Central Asia. Spanning from the Mediterranean Sea and Hellespont in the west to the Indus River in the east, the empire created by Cyrus was the largest the world had yet seen. At its maximum extent under his successors, the Achaemenid Empire stretched from parts of the Balkans (Eastern Bulgaria–Paeonia and Thrace–Macedonia) and Southeast Europe proper in the west to the Indus Valley in the east.

The reign of Cyrus lasted about thirty years; his empire took root with his conquests of the Median Empire, then the Lydian Empire and eventually the Neo-Babylonian Empire. He also led an expedition into Central Asia, which resulted in major campaigns that were described as having brought "into subjection every nation without exception". Cyrus did not venture into Egypt, and was alleged to have died in battle while fighting the Massagetae, an ancient Eastern Iranian nomadic tribal  confederation, along the Syr Darya in December 530 BC. However, Xenophon claimed that Cyrus did not die in battle and returned to the Achaemenid ceremonial capital of Persepolis again. He was succeeded by his son, Cambyses II, who managed to conquer Egypt, Nubia and Cyrenaica during his short rule.

Known as Cyrus the Elder to the Greeks, he was well-known for having respected the customs and religions of the lands he conquered. He was important in developing the system of a central administration at Pasargadae governing satraps in the empire's border regions, which worked very effectively and profitably for both rulers and subjects. The Edict of Restoration, a proclamation attested by a cylinder seal in which Cyrus authorized and encouraged the return of the Israelites to the Land of Israel following his conquest of the Neo-Babylonian Empire, is described in the Bible and likewise left a lasting legacy on the Jewish religion due to his role in ending the Babylonian captivity and facilitating the Jewish return to Zion. According to Isaiah 45:1 of the Hebrew Bible, God anointed Cyrus for this task, even referring to him as a messiah; Cyrus is the only non-Jewish figure in the Bible to be revered in this capacity.

Cyrus is also recognized for his achievements in human rights, politics, and military strategy, as well as his influence on both Eastern and Western civilizations. The Achaemenid influence in the ancient world would eventually extend as far as Athens, where upper-class Athenians adopted aspects of the culture of the ruling class of Achaemenid Persia as their own. Having originated from Persis, roughly corresponding to the modern-day Fars Province of Iran, Cyrus has played a crucial role in defining the national identity of modern Iran. He remains a cult figure amongst modern Iranians, with his tomb serving as a spot of reverence for millions of people. In the 1970s, the last Shah of Iran, Mohammad Reza Pahlavi, identified Cyrus' famous proclamation inscribed onto the Cyrus Cylinder as the oldest-known declaration of human rights, and the Cylinder has since been popularized as such. This view has been criticized by some Western historians as a misunderstanding of the Cylinder's generic nature as a traditional statement that new monarchs make at the beginning of their reign.

Etymology 

The name Cyrus is a Latinized form derived from the Greek-language name Κῦρος (Kỹros), which itself was derived from the Old Persian name Kūruš. The name and its meaning have been recorded within ancient inscriptions in different languages. The ancient Greek historians Ctesias and Plutarch stated that Cyrus was named from the Sun (Kuros), a concept which has been interpreted as meaning "like the Sun" (Khurvash) by noting its relation to the Persian noun for Sun, khor, while using -vash as a suffix of likeness.
Karl Hoffmann has suggested a translation based on the meaning of an Indo-European root "to humiliate", and accordingly, the name "Cyrus" means "humiliator of the enemy in verbal contest". Another possible Iranian derivation would mean "the young one, child", related to Kurdish kur ("son, little boy") or Ossetian i-gur-un ("to be born") and kur (young bull). In the Bible, he is referred to in the Hebrew language as Koresh. Some pieces of evidence suggest that Cyrus is Kay Khosrow, a legendary Persian king of the Kayanian dynasty and a character in Shahnameh, a Persian epic.

Some scholars, however, believe that neither Cyrus nor Cambyses were Iranian names, proposing that Cyrus was Elamite in origin and that the name meant "he who bestows care" in the extinct Elamite language. One reason is that, while Elamite names may end in -uš, no Elamite texts spell the name this way — only Kuraš. Meanwhile, Old Persian did not allow names to end in -aš, so it would make sense for Persian speakers to change an original Kuraš into the more grammatically correct form Kuruš. Elamite scribes, on the other hand, would not have had a reason to change an original Kuruš into Kuraš, since both forms were acceptable. Therefore, Kuraš probably represents the original form.

Dynastic history

The Persian domination and kingdom in the Iranian plateau started as an extension of the Achaemenid dynasty, who expanded their earlier dominion possibly from the 9th century BC onward. The eponymous founder of the dynasty was Achaemenes (from Old Persian Haxāmaniš). Achaemenids are "descendants of Achaemenes", as Darius the Great, the ninth king of the dynasty, traces his ancestry to him, declaring "for this reason we are called Achaemenids." Achaemenes built the state Parsumash in the southwest of Iran and was succeeded by Teispes, who took the title "King of Anshan" after seizing the city Anshan and enlarging his kingdom further to include Pars proper. Ancient documents mention that Teispes had a son called Cyrus I, who also succeeded his father as "king of Anshan". Cyrus I had a full brother whose name is recorded as Ariaramnes.

In 600 BC, Cyrus I was succeeded by his son, Cambyses I, who reigned until 559 BC. Cyrus II "the Great" was a son of Cambyses I, who had named his son after his father, Cyrus I. There are several inscriptions of Cyrus the Great and later kings that refer to Cambyses I as the "great king" and "king of Anshan". Among these are some passages in the Cyrus cylinder where Cyrus calls himself "son of Cambyses, great king, king of Anshan". Another inscription (from CM's) mentions Cambyses I as a "mighty king" and "an Achaemenian", which according to the bulk of scholarly opinion was engraved under Darius and considered as a later forgery by Darius. However Cambyses II's maternal grandfather Pharnaspes is named by historian Herodotus as "an Achaemenian" too. Xenophon's account in Cyropædia further names Cambyses's wife as Mandane and mentions Cambyses as king of Iran (ancient Persia). These agree with Cyrus's own inscriptions, as Anshan and Parsa were different names of the same land. These also agree with other non-Iranian accounts, except at one point from Herodotus stating that Cambyses was not a king but a "Persian of good family". However, in some other passages, Herodotus's account is wrong also on the name of the son of Chishpish, which he mentions as Cambyses but according to modern scholars, should be Cyrus I.

The traditional view based on archaeological research and the genealogy given in the Behistun Inscription and by Herodotus holds that Cyrus the Great was an Achaemenid. However, M. Waters has suggested that Cyrus is unrelated to the Achaemenids or Darius the Great, and that his family was of Teispid and Anshanite origin instead of Achaemenid.

Early life

Cyrus was born to Cambyses I, King of Anshan, and Mandane, daughter of Astyages, King of Media, during the period of 600–599 BC.

By his own account, generally believed now to be accurate, Cyrus was preceded as king by his father Cambyses I, grandfather Cyrus I, and great-grandfather Teispes. Cyrus married Cassandane who was an Achaemenian and the daughter of Pharnaspes who bore him two sons, Cambyses II and Bardiya along with three daughters, Atossa, Artystone, and Roxane. Cyrus and Cassandane were known to love each other very much – Cassandane said that she found it more bitter to leave Cyrus than to depart her life. After her death, Cyrus insisted on public mourning throughout the kingdom. The Nabonidus Chronicle states that Babylonia mourned Cassandane for six days (identified as 21–26 March 538 BC). After his father's death, Cyrus inherited the Persian throne at Pasargadae, which was a vassal of Astyages. The Greek historian Strabo has said that Cyrus was originally named Agradates by his step-parents. It is possible that, when reuniting with his original family, following the naming customs, Cyrus's father, Cambyses I, named him Cyrus after his grandfather, who was Cyrus I. There is also an account by Strabo that claimed Agradates adopted the name Cyrus after the Cyrus river near Pasargadae.

Mythology

Herodotus gave a mythological account of Cyrus's early life. In this account, Astyages had two prophetic dreams in which a flood, and then a series of fruit-bearing vines, emerged from his daughter Mandane's pelvis, and covered the entire kingdom. These were interpreted by his advisers as a foretelling that his grandson would one day rebel and supplant him as king. Astyages summoned Mandane, at the time pregnant with Cyrus, back to Ecbatana to have the child killed. General Harpagus delegated the task to Mithradates, one of the shepherds of Astyages, who raised the child and passed off his stillborn son to Harpagus as the dead infant Cyrus. Cyrus lived in secrecy, but when he reached the age of 10, during a childhood game, he had the son of a nobleman beaten when he refused to obey Cyrus's commands. As it was unheard of for the son of a shepherd to commit such an act, Astyages had the boy brought to his court, and interviewed him and his adoptive father. Upon the shepherd's confession, Astyages sent Cyrus back to Persia to live with his biological parents. However, Astyages summoned the son of Harpagus, and in retribution, chopped him to pieces, roasted some portions while boiling others, and tricked his adviser into eating his child during a large banquet. Following the meal, Astyages' servants brought Harpagus the head, hands and feet of his son on platters, so he could realize his inadvertent cannibalism. In another version, Cyrus was presented as the son of a poor family that worked in the Median court.

Rise and military campaigns

Median Empire

Cyrus the Great succeeded to the throne in 559 BC following his father's death; however, Cyrus was not yet an independent ruler. Like his predecessors, Cyrus had to recognize Median overlordship. Astyages, last king of the Median Empire and Cyrus' grandfather, may have ruled over the majority of the Ancient Near East, from the Lydian frontier in the west to the Parthians and Persians in the east.

According to the Nabonidus Chronicle, Astyages launched an attack against Cyrus, "king of Ansan". According to the historian Herodotus, it is known that Astyages placed Harpagus in command of the Median army to conquer Cyrus. However, Harpagus contacted Cyrus and encouraged his revolt against Media, before eventually defecting along with several of the nobility and a portion of the army. This mutiny is confirmed by the Nabonidus Chronicle. The Chronicle suggests that the hostilities lasted for at least three years (553–550), and the final battle resulted in the capture of Ecbatana. This was described in the paragraph that preceded the entry for Nabonidus' year 7, which detailed Cyrus' victory and the capture of his grandfather. According to the historians Herodotus and Ctesias, Cyrus spared the life of Astyages and married his daughter, Amytis. This marriage pacified several vassals, including the Bactrians, Parthians, and Saka. Herodotus notes that Cyrus also subdued and incorporated Sogdia into the empire during his military campaigns of 546–539 BC.

With Astyages out of power, all of his vassals (including many of Cyrus's relatives) were now under his command. His uncle Arsames, who had been the king of the city-state of Parsa under the Medes, therefore would have had to give up his throne. However, this transfer of power within the family seems to have been smooth, and it is likely that Arsames was still the nominal governor of Parsa under Cyrus's authority—more a Prince or a Grand Duke than a King. His son, Hystaspes, who was also Cyrus's second cousin, was then made satrap of Parthia and Phrygia. Cyrus the Great thus united the twin Achaemenid kingdoms of Parsa and Anshan into Persia proper. Arsames lived to see his grandson become Darius the Great, Shahanshah of Persia, after the deaths of both of Cyrus's sons. Cyrus's conquest of Media was merely the start of his wars.

Lydian Empire and Asia Minor

The exact dates of the Lydian conquest are unknown, but it must have taken place between Cyrus's overthrow of the Median kingdom (550 BC) and his conquest of Babylon (539 BC). It was common in the past to give 547 BC as the year of the conquest due to some interpretations of the Nabonidus Chronicle, but this position is currently not much held. The Lydians first attacked the Achaemenid Empire's city of Pteria in Cappadocia. Croesus besieged and captured the city enslaving its inhabitants. Meanwhile, the Persians invited the citizens of Ionia who were part of the Lydian kingdom to revolt against their ruler. The offer was rebuffed, and thus Cyrus levied an army and marched against the Lydians, increasing his numbers while passing through nations in his way. The Battle of Pteria was effectively a stalemate, with both sides suffering heavy casualties by nightfall. Croesus retreated to Sardis the following morning.

While in Sardis, Croesus sent out requests for his allies to send aid to Lydia. However, near the end of the winter, before the allies could unite, Cyrus the Great pushed the war into Lydian territory and besieged Croesus in his capital, Sardis. Shortly before the final Battle of Thymbra between the two rulers, Harpagus advised Cyrus the Great to place his dromedaries in front of his warriors; the Lydian horses, not used to the dromedaries' smell, would be very afraid. The strategy worked; the Lydian cavalry was routed. Cyrus defeated and captured Croesus. Cyrus occupied the capital at Sardis, conquering the Lydian kingdom in 546 BC. According to Herodotus, Cyrus the Great spared Croesus's life and kept him as an advisor, but this account conflicts with some translations of the contemporary Nabonidus Chronicle (the King who was himself subdued by Cyrus the Great after conquest of Babylonia), which interpret that the king of Lydia was slain.

Before returning to the capital, Commagene was incorporated into Persia in 546 BCE. Later, a Lydian named Pactyas was entrusted by Cyrus the Great to send Croesus's treasury to Persia. However, soon after Cyrus's departure, Pactyas hired mercenaries and caused an uprising in Sardis, revolting against the Persian satrap of Lydia, Tabalus. With recommendations from Croesus that he should turn the minds of the Lydian people to luxury, Cyrus sent Mazares, one of his commanders, to subdue the insurrection but demanded that Pactyas be returned alive. Upon Mazares's arrival, Pactyas fled to Ionia, where he had hired more mercenaries. Mazares marched his troops into the Greek country and subdued the cities of Magnesia and Priene. The end of Pactyas is unknown, but after capture, he was probably sent to Cyrus and put to death after a succession of tortures.

Mazares continued the conquest of Asia Minor but died of unknown causes during his campaign in Ionia. Cyrus sent Harpagus to complete Mazares's conquest of Asia Minor. Harpagus captured Lycia, Cilicia and Phoenicia, using the technique of building earthworks to breach the walls of besieged cities, a method unknown to the Greeks. He ended his conquest of the area in 542 BC and returned to Persia.

Eastern Campaigns

After the conquest of Lydia, Cyrus campaigned at the east around 545 BC to 540 BC. Cyrus first tried to campaign against Gedrosia, however was decisively defeated and had to leave the land. The land of Gedrosia was most likely under the reign of Darius I. After the failed attempt in Gedrosia, Cyrus attacked in the regions of Bactria, Arachosia, Sogdia,Saka, Chorasmia, Margiana and other provinces in the east. In 533 BC, Cyrus the Great crossed the Hindu Kush mountains and collected tribute from the Indus cities. Thus, Cyrus probably had vassalage in India. Cyrus then returned to camp near Babylon due to unrest in Babylon.

Neo-Babylonian Empire

By the year 540 BC, Cyrus captured Elam (Susiana) and its capital, Susa. The Nabonidus Chronicle records that, prior to the battle(s), Nabonidus had ordered cult statues from outlying Babylonian cities to be brought into the capital, suggesting that the conflict had begun possibly in the winter of 540 BC. Near the beginning of October 539 BC, Cyrus fought the Battle of Opis in or near the strategic riverside city of Opis on the Tigris, north of Babylon. The Babylonian army was routed, and on 10 October, Sippar was seized without a battle, with little to no resistance from the populace. It is probable that Cyrus engaged in negotiations with the Babylonian generals to obtain a compromise on their part and therefore avoid an armed confrontation. Nabonidus, who had retreated to Sippar following his defeat at Opis, fled to Borsippa.

Two days later, on 12 October (proleptic Gregorian calendar), Gubaru's troops entered Babylon, again without any resistance from the Babylonian armies, and detained Nabonidus. Herodotus explains that to accomplish this feat, the Persians, using a basin dug earlier by the Babylonian queen Nitokris to protect Babylon against Median attacks, diverted the Euphrates river into a canal so that the water level dropped "to the height of the middle of a man's thigh", which allowed the invading forces to march directly through the river bed to enter at night. Shortly thereafter, Nabonidus returned from Borsippa and surrendered to Cyrus. On 29 October, Cyrus himself entered the city of Babylon.

Prior to Cyrus's invasion of Babylon, the Neo-Babylonian Empire had conquered many kingdoms. In addition to Babylonia itself, Cyrus probably incorporated its subnational entities into his Empire, including Syria, Judea, and Arabia Petraea, although there is no direct evidence of this fact.

After taking Babylon, Cyrus the Great proclaimed himself "king of Babylon, king of Sumer and Akkad, king of the four corners of the world" in the famous Cyrus Cylinder, an inscription deposited in the foundations of the Esagila temple dedicated to the chief Babylonian god, Marduk. The text of the cylinder denounces Nabonidus as impious and portrays the victorious Cyrus pleasing the god Marduk. It describes how Cyrus had improved the lives of the citizens of Babylonia, repatriated displaced peoples, and restored temples and cult sanctuaries. Although some have asserted that the cylinder represents a form of human rights charter, historians generally portray it in the context of a long-standing Mesopotamian tradition of new rulers beginning their reigns with declarations of reforms.

Cyrus the Great's dominions composed the largest empire the world had ever seen to that point. At the end of Cyrus' rule, the Achaemenid Empire stretched from Asia Minor in the west to the Indus River in the east.

Death
The details of Cyrus's death vary by account. The account of Herodotus from his Histories provides the second-longest detail, in which Cyrus met his fate in a fierce battle with the Massagetae, an Iranian tribal confederation from the southern deserts of Khwarezm and Kyzyl Kum in the southernmost portion of the Eurasian Steppe regions of modern-day Kazakhstan and Uzbekistan, following the advice of Croesus to attack them in their own territory. The Massagetae were related to the Scythians in their dress and mode of living; they fought on horseback and on foot. In order to acquire her realm, Cyrus first sent an offer of marriage to their ruler, the empress Tomyris, a proposal she rejected.

He then commenced his attempt to take Massagetae territory by force (c. 529), beginning by building bridges and towered war boats along his side of the river Oxus, or Amu Darya, which separated them. Sending him a warning to cease his encroachment (a warning which she stated she expected he would disregard anyway), Tomyris challenged him to meet her forces in honorable warfare, inviting him to a location in her country a day's march from the river, where their two armies would formally engage each other. He accepted her offer, but, learning that the Massagetae were unfamiliar with wine and its intoxicating effects, he set up and then left camp with plenty of it behind, taking his best soldiers with him and leaving the least capable ones.

The general of Tomyris's army, Spargapises, who was also her son, and a third of the Massagetian troops, killed the group Cyrus had left there and, finding the camp well stocked with food and the wine, unwittingly drank themselves into inebriation, diminishing their capability to defend themselves when they were then overtaken by a surprise attack. They were successfully defeated, and, although he was taken prisoner, Spargapises committed suicide once he regained sobriety. Upon learning of what had transpired, Tomyris denounced Cyrus's tactics as underhanded and swore vengeance, leading a second wave of troops into battle herself. Cyrus the Great was ultimately killed, and his forces suffered massive casualties in what Herodotus referred to as the fiercest battle of his career and the ancient world. When it was over, Tomyris ordered the body of Cyrus brought to her, then decapitated him and dipped his head in a vessel of blood in a symbolic gesture of revenge for his bloodlust and the death of her son. However, some scholars question this version, mostly because even Herodotus admits this event was one of many versions of Cyrus's death that he heard from a supposedly reliable source who told him no one was there to see the aftermath.

Herodotus also recounts that Cyrus saw in his sleep the oldest son of Hystaspes (Darius I) with wings upon his shoulders, shadowing with the one wing Asia, and with the other wing Europe. Archaeologist Sir Max Mallowan explains this statement by Herodotus and its connection with the four winged bas-relief figure of Cyrus the Great in the following way:

Muhammad Dandamayev says that Persians may have taken Cyrus' body back from the Massagetae, unlike what Herodotus claimed.

According to the Chronicle of Michael the Syrian (AD 1166–1199) Cyrus was killed by his wife Tomyris, queen of the Massagetae (Maksata), in the 60th year of Jewish captivity.

Ctesias, in his Persica, has the longest account, which says Cyrus met his death while putting down resistance from the Derbices infantry, aided by other Scythian archers and cavalry, plus Indians and their war-elephants. According to him, this event took place northeast of the headwaters of the Syr Darya. An alternative account from Xenophon's Cyropaedia contradicts the others, claiming that Cyrus died peacefully at his capital. The final version of Cyrus's death comes from Berossus, who only reports that Cyrus met his death while warring against the Dahae archers northwest of the headwaters of the Syr Darya.

Burial

Cyrus the Great's remains may have been interred in his capital city of Pasargadae, where today a limestone tomb (built around 540–530 BC) still exists, which many believe to be his. Strabo and Arrian give nearly identical descriptions of the tomb, based on the eyewitness report of Aristobulus of Cassandreia, who at the request of Alexander the Great visited the tomb twice. Though the city itself is now in ruins, the burial place of Cyrus the Great has remained largely intact, and the tomb has been partially restored to counter its natural deterioration over the centuries. According to Plutarch, his epitaph read:

Cuneiform evidence from Babylon proves that Cyrus died around December 530 BC, and that his son Cambyses II had become king. Cambyses continued his father's policy of expansion, and captured Egypt for the Empire, but soon died after only seven years of rule. He was succeeded either by Cyrus's other son Bardiya or an impostor posing as Bardiya, who became the sole ruler of Persia for seven months, until he was killed by Darius the Great.

The translated ancient Roman and Greek accounts give a vivid description of the tomb both geometrically and aesthetically; the tomb's geometric shape has changed little over the years, still maintaining a large stone of quadrangular form at the base, followed by a pyramidal succession of smaller rectangular stones, until after a few slabs, the structure is curtailed by an edifice, with an arched roof composed of a pyramidal shaped stone, and a small opening or window on the side, where the slenderest man could barely squeeze through.

Within this edifice was a golden coffin, resting on a table with golden supports, inside of which the body of Cyrus the Great was interred. Upon his resting place, was a covering of tapestry and drapes made from the best available Babylonian materials, utilizing fine Median worksmanship; below his bed was a fine red carpet, covering the narrow rectangular area of his tomb. Translated Greek accounts describe the tomb as having been placed in the fertile Pasargadae gardens, surrounded by trees and ornamental shrubs, with a group of Achaemenian protectors called the "Magi", stationed nearby to protect the edifice from theft or damage.

Years later, in the chaos created by Alexander the Great's invasion of Persia and after the defeat of Darius III, Cyrus the Great's tomb was broken into and most of its luxuries were looted. When Alexander reached the tomb, he was horrified by the manner in which the tomb was treated, and questioned the Magi and put them to court. On some accounts, Alexander's decision to put the Magi on trial was more about his attempt to undermine their influence and his show of power in his newly conquered empire, than a concern for Cyrus's tomb. However, Alexander admired Cyrus, from an early age reading Xenophon's Cyropaedia, which described Cyrus's heroism in battle and governance as a king and legislator. Regardless, Alexander the Great ordered Aristobulus to improve the tomb's condition and restore its interior. Despite his admiration for Cyrus the Great, and his attempts at renovation of his tomb, Alexander had, six years previously (330 BC), sacked Persepolis, the opulent city that Cyrus may have chosen the site for, and either ordered its burning as an act of pro-Greek propaganda or set it on fire during drunken revels.

The edifice has survived the test of time, through invasions, internal divisions, successive empires, regime changes, and revolutions. The last prominent Persian figure to bring attention to the tomb was Mohammad Reza Pahlavi (Shah of Iran) the last official monarch of Persia, during his celebrations of 2,500 years of monarchy. Just as Alexander the Great before him, the Shah of Iran wanted to appeal to Cyrus's legacy to legitimize his own rule by extension. The United Nations recognizes the tomb of Cyrus the Great and Pasargadae as a UNESCO World Heritage site.

Legacy

British historian Charles Freeman suggests that "In scope and extent his achievements [Cyrus] ranked far above that of the Macedonian king, Alexander, who was to demolish the [Achaemenid] empire in the 320s but fail to provide any stable alternative." Cyrus has been a personal hero to many people, including Thomas Jefferson, Mohammad Reza Pahlavi, and David Ben-Gurion.

The achievements of Cyrus the Great throughout antiquity are reflected in the way he is remembered today. His own nation, the Iranians, have regarded him as "The Father," the very title that had been used during the time of Cyrus himself, by the many nations that he conquered, as according to Xenophon:

The Babylonians regarded him as "The Liberator".

The Book of Ezra narrates a story of the first return of exiles in the first year of Cyrus, in which Cyrus proclaims: "All the kingdoms of the earth hath the LORD, the God of heaven, given me; and He hath charged me to build Him a house in Jerusalem, which is in Judah."()

Cyrus was distinguished equally as a statesman and as a soldier. Due in part to the political infrastructure he created, the Achaemenid Empire endured long after his death.

The rise of Persia under Cyrus's rule had a profound impact on the course of world history. Iranian philosophy, literature and religion all played dominant roles in world events for the next millennium. Despite the Islamic conquest of Persia in the 7th century AD by the Islamic Caliphate, Persia continued to exercise enormous influence in the Middle East during the Islamic Golden Age, and was particularly instrumental in the growth and expansion of Islam.

Many of the Iranian dynasties following the Achaemenid Empire and their kings saw themselves as the heirs to Cyrus the Great and have claimed to continue the line begun by Cyrus. However, there are different opinions among scholars whether this is also the case for the Sassanid Dynasty.

Alexander the Great was himself infatuated with and admired Cyrus the Great, from an early age reading Xenophon's Cyropaedia, which described Cyrus's heroism in battle and governance and his abilities as a king and a legislator. During his visit to Pasargadae he ordered Aristobulus to decorate the interior of the sepulchral chamber of Cyrus's tomb.

Cyrus's legacy has been felt even as far away as Iceland and colonial America. Many of the thinkers and rulers of Classical Antiquity as well as the Renaissance and Enlightenment era, and the forefathers of the United States of America sought inspiration from Cyrus the Great through works such as Cyropaedia. Thomas Jefferson, for example, owned two copies of Cyropaedia, one with parallel Greek and Latin translations on facing pages showing substantial Jefferson markings that signify the amount of influence the book has had on drafting the United States Declaration of Independence.

According to Professor Richard Nelson Frye, Cyrus – whose abilities as conqueror and administrator Frye says are attested by the longevity and vigor of the Achaemenid Empire – held an almost mythic role among the Persian people "similar to that of Romulus and Remus in Rome or Moses for the Israelites", with a story that "follows in many details the stories of hero and conquerors from elsewhere in the ancient world." Frye writes, "He became the epitome of the great qualities expected of a ruler in antiquity, and he assumed heroic features as a conqueror who was tolerant and magnanimous as well as brave and daring. His personality as seen by the Greeks influenced them and Alexander the Great, and, as the tradition was transmitted by the Romans, may be considered to influence our thinking even now."

Religion and philosophy

Though it is generally believed that Zarathushtra's teachings maintained influence on Cyrus's acts and policies, so far no clear evidence has been found to indicate that Cyrus practiced a specific religion. Pierre Briant wrote that given the poor information we have, "it seems quite reckless to try to reconstruct what the religion of Cyrus might have been."

The policies of Cyrus with respect to treatment of minority religions are documented in Babylonian texts as well as Jewish sources and the historians accounts. Cyrus had a general policy of religious tolerance throughout his vast empire. Whether this was a new policy or the continuation of policies followed by the Babylonians and Assyrians (as Lester Grabbe maintains) is disputed. He brought peace to the Babylonians and is said to have kept his army away from the temples and restored the statues of the Babylonian gods to their sanctuaries.

His treatment of the Jews during their exile in Babylon after Nebuchadnezzar II destroyed Jerusalem is reported in the Bible. The Jewish Bible's Ketuvim ends in Second Chronicles with the decree of Cyrus, which returned the exiles to the Promised Land from Babylon along with a commission to rebuild the temple.

This edict is also fully reproduced in the Book of Ezra.

In the first year of King Cyrus, Cyrus the king issued a decree: "Concerning the house of God at Jerusalem, let the temple, the place where sacrifices are offered, be rebuilt and let its foundations be retained, its height being 60 cubits and its width 60 cubits; with three layers of huge stones and one layer of timbers. And let the cost be paid from the royal treasury. Also let the gold and silver utensils of the house of God, which Nebuchadnezzar took from the temple in Jerusalem and brought to Babylon, be returned and brought to their places in the temple in Jerusalem; and you shall put them in the house of God." —

The Jews honored him as a dignified and righteous king. In one Biblical passage, Isaiah refers to him as Messiah (lit. "His anointed one"), making him the only gentile to be so referred. Elsewhere in Isaiah, God is described as saying, "I will raise up Cyrus in my righteousness: I will make all his ways straight. He will rebuild my city and set my exiles free, but not for a price or reward, says God Almighty." As the text suggests, Cyrus did ultimately release the nation of Israel from its exile without compensation or tribute. These particular passages (Isaiah 40–55, often referred to as Deutero-Isaiah) are believed by most modern critical scholars to have been added by another author toward the end of the Babylonian exile 

Josephus, the first-century Jewish historian, relates the traditional view of the Jews regarding the prediction of Cyrus in Isaiah in his Antiquities of the Jews, book 11, chapter 1:

While Cyrus was praised in the Tanakh ( and ), there was Jewish criticism of him after he was lied to by the Cuthites, who wanted to halt the building of the Second Temple. They accused the Jews of conspiring to rebel, so Cyrus in turn stopped the construction, which would not be completed until 515 BC, during the reign of Darius I.
According to the Bible it was King Artaxerxes who was convinced to stop the construction of the temple in Jerusalem. (Ezra 4:7–24)

The historical nature of this decree has been challenged. Professor Lester L Grabbe argues that there was no decree but that there was a policy that allowed exiles to return to their homelands and rebuild their temples. He also argues that the archaeology suggests that the return was a "trickle", taking place over perhaps decades, resulting in a maximum population of perhaps 30,000. Philip R. Davies called the authenticity of the decree "dubious", citing Grabbe and adding that arguing against "the authenticity of Ezra 1.1–4 is J. Briend, in a paper given at the Institut Catholique de Paris on 15 December 1993, who denies that it resembles the form of an official document but reflects rather biblical prophetic idiom."
Mary Joan Winn Leith believes that the decree in Ezra might be authentic and along with the Cylinder that Cyrus, like earlier rulers, was through these decrees trying to gain support from those who might be strategically important, particularly those close to Egypt which he wished to conquer. He also wrote that "appeals to Marduk in the cylinder and to Yahweh in the biblical decree demonstrate the Persian tendency to co-opt local religious and political traditions in the interest of imperial control."

Some modern Muslims have suggested that the Quranic figure of Dhu al-Qarnayn is a representation of Cyrus the Great, but the scholarly consensus is that he is a development of legends concerning Alexander the Great.

Politics and management
Cyrus founded the empire as a multi-state empire governed by four capital states; Pasargadae, Babylon, Susa and Ecbatana. He allowed a certain amount of regional autonomy in each state, in the form of a satrapy system. A satrapy was an administrative unit, usually organized on a geographical basis. A 'satrap' (governor) was the vassal king, who administered the region, a 'general' supervised military recruitment and ensured order, and a 'state secretary' kept the official records. The general and the state secretary reported directly to the satrap as well as the central government.

During his reign, Cyrus maintained control over a vast region of conquered kingdoms, achieved through retaining and expanding the satrapies. Further organization of newly conquered territories into provinces ruled by satraps, was continued by Cyrus's successor Darius the Great. Cyrus's empire was based on tribute and conscripts from the many parts of his realm.

Through his military savvy, Cyrus created an organized army including the Immortals unit, consisting of 10,000 highly trained soldiers. He also formed an innovative postal system throughout the empire, based on several relay stations called Chapar Khaneh.

Cyrus's conquests began a new era in the age of empire building, where a vast superstate, comprising many dozens of countries, races, religions, and languages, were ruled under a single administration headed by a central government. This system lasted for centuries, and was retained both by the invading Seleucid dynasty during their control of Persia, and later Iranian dynasties including the Parthians and Sasanians.

Cyrus has been known for his innovations in building projects; he further developed the technologies that he found in the conquered cultures and applied them in building the palaces of Pasargadae. He was also famous for his love of gardens; the recent excavations in his capital city has revealed the existence of the Pasargadae Persian Garden and a network of irrigation canals. Pasargadae was a place for two magnificent palaces surrounded by a majestic royal park and vast formal gardens; among them was the four-quartered wall gardens of "Paradisia" with over 1000 meters of channels made out of carved limestone, designed to fill small basins at every 16 meters and water various types of wild and domestic flora. The design and concept of Paradisia were exceptional and have been used as a model for many ancient and modern parks, ever since.

The English physician and philosopher Sir Thomas Browne penned a discourse entitled The Garden of Cyrus in 1658 in which Cyrus is depicted as an archetypal "wise ruler" – while the Protectorate of Cromwell ruled Britain.

"Cyrus the elder brought up in Woods and Mountains, when time and power enabled, pursued the dictate of his education, and brought the treasures of the field into rule and circumscription. So nobly beautifying the hanging Gardens of Babylon, that he was also thought to be the author thereof."

Cyrus' standard, described as a golden eagle mounted upon a "lofty shaft", remained the official banner of the Achaemenids.

Cyrus Cylinder

One of the few surviving sources of information that can be dated directly to Cyrus's time is the Cyrus Cylinder, a document in the form of a clay cylinder inscribed in Akkadian cuneiform. It had been placed in the foundations of the Esagila (the temple of Marduk in Babylon) as a foundation deposit following the Persian conquest in 539 BC. It was discovered in 1879 and is kept today in the British Museum in London.

The text of the cylinder denounces the deposed Babylonian king Nabonidus as impious and portrays Cyrus as pleasing to the chief god Marduk. It describes how Cyrus had improved the lives of the citizens of Babylonia, repatriated displaced peoples and restored temples and cult sanctuaries. Although not mentioned specifically in the text, the repatriation of the Jews from their "Babylonian captivity" has been interpreted as part of this general policy.

In the 1970s the Shah of Iran adopted the Cyrus cylinder as a political symbol, using it "as a central image in his celebration of 2500 years of Iranian monarchy". and asserting that it was "the first human rights charter in history". This view has been disputed by some as "rather anachronistic" and tendentious, as the modern concept of human rights would have been quite alien to Cyrus's contemporaries and is not mentioned by the cylinder. The cylinder has, nonetheless, become seen as part of Iran's cultural identity.

The United Nations has declared the relic to be an "ancient declaration of human rights" since 1971, approved by then Secretary General Sithu U Thant, after he "was given a replica by the sister of the Shah of Iran". The British Museum describes the cylinder as "an instrument of ancient Mesopotamian propaganda" that "reflects a long tradition in Mesopotamia where, from as early as the third millennium BC, kings began their reigns with declarations of reforms." The cylinder emphasizes Cyrus's continuity with previous Babylonian rulers, asserting his virtue as a traditional Babylonian king while denigrating his predecessor.

Neil MacGregor, Director of the British Museum, has stated that the cylinder was "the first attempt we know about running a society, a state with different nationalities and faiths – a new kind of statecraft." He explained that "It has even been described as the first declaration of human rights, and while this was never the intention of the document – the modern concept of human rights scarcely existed in the ancient world – it has come to embody the hopes and aspirations of many."

Titles 
His regal titles in full were The Great King, King of Persia, King of Anshan, King of Media, King of Babylon, King of Sumer and Akkad, and King of the Four Corners of the World. The Nabonidus Chronicle notes the change in his title from "King of Anshan" to "King of Persia". Assyriologist François Vallat wrote that "When Astyages marched against Cyrus, Cyrus is called 'King of Anshan", but when Cyrus crosses the Tigris on his way to Lydia, he is 'King of Persia.' The coup therefore took place between these two events."

Family tree

See also 
 Kay Bahman
 List of biblical figures identified in extra-biblical sources
 List of people known as the Great
 2016 Cyrus the Great Revolt

Notes

References

Bibliography

Ancient sources

 The Nabonidus Chronicle of the Babylonian Chronicles
 The Verse account of Nabonidus
 The Prayer of Nabonidus (one of the Dead Sea scrolls)
 The Cyrus Cylinder

 Herodotus (The Histories)
 Ctesias (Persica)

 The biblical books of Isaiah, Daniel, Ezra and Nehemiah
 Flavius Josephus (Antiquities of the Jews)
 Thucydides (History of the Peloponnesian War)
 Plato (Laws (dialogue))
 Xenophon (Cyropaedia)
 Quintus Curtius Rufus (Library of World History)
 Plutarchos (Plutarch's Lives)
 Fragments of Nicolaus of Damascus
 Arrian (Anabasis Alexandri)
 Polyaenus (Stratagems in War)
 Justin (Epitome of the Philippic History of Pompeius Trogus ) 
 Polybius (The Histories (Polybius))
 Diodorus Siculus (Bibliotheca historica)
 Athenaeus (Deipnosophistae)
 Strabo (History)
 Quran (Dhul-Qarnayn, Al-Kahf)

Modern sources

 
 
 
 
 
 
 
 Church, Alfred J. (1881). Stories of the East From Herodotus. London: Seeley, Jackson & Halliday.
 
 
 
 
 
 Frye, Richard N. (1962). The Heritage of Persia. London: Weidenfeld and Nicolson. 
 
 
 
 
 Moorey, P.R.S. (1991). The Biblical Lands, VI. New York: Peter Bedrick Books . 
 Olmstead, A. T. (1948). History of the Persian Empire [Achaemenid Period]. Chicago: University of Chicago Press. 
 Palou, Christine; Palou, Jean (1962). La Perse Antique. Paris: Presses Universitaires de France.

Further reading
 Amelie Kuhrt: Ancient Near Eastern History: The Case of Cyrus the Great of Persia. In: Hugh Godfrey Maturin Williamson: Understanding the History of Ancient Israel. Oxford University Press 2007, pp. 107–28

External links

 Cyrus Cylinder  Full Babylonian text of the Cyrus Cylinder as it was known in 2001; translation; brief introduction
 Xenophon, Cyropaedia: the education of Cyrus, translated by Henry Graham Dakyns and revised by F.M. Stawell, Project Gutenberg.

|-

|-

|-

|-

 
600s BC births
Year of birth uncertain
530 BC deaths
6th-century BC Kings of the Achaemenid Empire
Kings of Anshan (Persia)
6th-century BC Babylonian kings
Founding monarchs
Monarchs killed in action
Kings of the Universe
City founders
Babylonian captivity
Kings of the Lands
Teispids